Tennis competitions at the 1986 Asian Games at the Seoul Olympic Park Tennis Center in Seoul were held from 22 September to 3 October 1986.

South Korea dominated the competition winning four gold medals.

Medalists

Medal table

See also
 Tennis at the Asian Games

References

External links
Olympic Council of Asia

 
1986 Asian Games events
1986
Asian Games
1986 Asian Games